Woman and the Hunter, later re-released in the UK as Triangle on Safari, is a 1957 film by director George Breakston starring American actress Ann Sheridan.

It was shot in Africa. It was the last feature film of Sheridan who later said she wished the film "had been lost somewhere in Kenya".

Plot

Cast
Ann Sheridan
David Farrar
Jan Merlin
John Loder

References

External links
Woman and the Hunter at IMDb
Woman and the Hunter at Letterbox DVD
1957 films